In Greek mythology, Phrontis (/fron-tis/; Ancient Greek: Φροντις means "thought, care, attention") may refer to the following personages:

Male
 Phrontis, son of Phrixus and Chalciope, daughter of King Aeetes.
Phrontis, son of Onetor and the steersman in Menelaus' vessel. Phrontis had a very high repute in his craft but he came to his end when he was already rounding Sunium in Attica for the god Apollo shot him dead. Menelaus stopped at the cape and then build Phrontis a tomb and pay him the due rites of burial.
Female

 Phrontis, wife of Panthous, one of the Elders of Troy, and mother of Euphorbus, Hyperenor and Polydamas.
 Phrontis, mother of Alastor in Adel Geras's Troy.

Notes

References 

 Homer, The Iliad with an English Translation by A.T. Murray, Ph.D. in two volumes. Cambridge, MA., Harvard University Press; London, William Heinemann, Ltd. 1924. . Online version at the Perseus Digital Library.
 Homer, Homeri Opera in five volumes. Oxford, Oxford University Press. 1920. . Greek text available at the Perseus Digital Library.
 Homer, The Odyssey with an English Translation by A.T. Murray, PH.D. in two volumes. Cambridge, MA., Harvard University Press; London, William Heinemann, Ltd. 1919. . Online version at the Perseus Digital Library. Greek text available from the same website.
 Pausanias, Description of Greece with an English Translation by W.H.S. Jones, Litt.D., and H.A. Ormerod, M.A., in 4 Volumes. Cambridge, MA, Harvard University Press; London, William Heinemann Ltd. 1918. . Online version at the Perseus Digital Library
 Pausanias, Graeciae Descriptio. 3 vols. Leipzig, Teubner. 1903.  Greek text available at the Perseus Digital Library.

Argonauts